Manjupoloru Penkutti is a 2004 Indian Malayalam-language thriller film directed by Kamal and written by Kalavoor Ravikumar. The plot is about a teenage girl who is abused by her stepfather. The film stars Amrita Prakash, Lalu Alex, Suresh Krishna, Jayakrishnan and Bhanupriya. Alphons Joseph composed the music. The film was shot in Kochi and Paris.

Plot

Nidhi is a sixteen-year-old girl who lives with her mother, Arundhathi, her stepfather, Mohan, and her 10-year-old sister, Kani. Later she meets a neighbour, Manuel, who treats her as his own daughter. She is friends with Sandeep, who has a crush on her. Nidhi had been abused by Mohan three years earlier, and plans to kill her stepfather.

Cast

Music
The film's music was composed by Alphons Joseph.
"Am I Dreaming": Sayanora Philip
"Ithile Nee Enthe Vannilla": Jyotsna, Karthik
"Ithile Nee Enthe Vannilla" (version 2): Jyotsna, Alphonse Joseph
"Kai Niraye Kadam Tharumo": Sujatha Mohan, Ganga
"Kashmera Sandhye": Ganga Shankar Mahadevan
"Kashmera Sandhye" (male): Shankar Mahadevan
"Manju Poloru Penkanavu": P. Jayachandran, George Peter, Vidhu Prathap

Reception
The film was accepted by the critics but failed at the box office.

References

External links
 

2000s Malayalam-language films
Indian teen films
2004 films
2004 romantic drama films
Films directed by Kamal (director)
Films shot in Paris
Films shot in Kochi
Films scored by Alphons Joseph